Seaspray may refer to:

 Sea spray, aerosol particles formed directly from the ocean

Military
 SEASPRAY, a clandestine U.S. Army special operations unit
 Operation Sea-Spray, a secret U.S. Navy experiment in which bacteria were sprayed over the San Francisco Bay Area in California
 Seaspray (radar), a series of British radar systems

Boats and ships
 , the Seaspray, an Empire ship, a cancelled cargo ship of the British WWII shipping service
 Seaspray (sailboat), a real sail boat that was fictionalized for the Australian TV show Adventures of the Seaspray

Entertainment
 Seaspray (Transformers), the name of several fictional characters in the Transformers series
 Seaspray (My Little Pony), a fictional character from My Little Pony

Other uses
 Seaspray, Victoria, Australia; a small coastal town in Gippsland

See also

 Seaspray group, a geological stratigraphic unit located in the Halibut Oil Field area, in the Tasman Strait, off the cost of Victoria
 
 
 Spray (disambiguation)
 Sea (disambiguation)
 Ocean Spray (disambiguation)